Benjamin Arthur Barnett  (23 March 1908 – 29 June 1979) was an Australian cricketer who played in four Tests in 1938.

Life and career
Barnett was educated at Scotch College in Melbourne. One of six siblings, he played cricket for Hawthorn-East Melbourne and Victoria during the 1920s and 1930s. He toured England as reserve wicket-keeper for the 1934 Australian Test team and his subsequent selection as principal wicket-keeper for the 1938 team attracted some controversy, other contenders being the aging Bert Oldfield and the younger Don Tallon. Barnett played in all four Tests in the series.

Barnett's cricket career was interrupted by World War II, when he volunteered for the army and served with 8th Divisional Signals in Singapore. When Singapore fell to the Japanese in 1942, Barnett was incarcerated first in Changi Prison and subsequently in Thailand on the railway. Acting as adjutant for 8th Div Sigs, Barnett maintained records which are now held in the Australian War Memorial (Canberra) and also the Signals Museum in Wantirna, Melbourne.

After the war, Barnett settled in England with his wife Mollie and sons Ian and Ross. Working at the time for the Australian pharmaceutical firm Aspro-Nicholas, he played Minor Counties cricket for Buckinghamshire. At the age of 45, he captained the Commonwealth XI team that toured India in 1953-54. He played in 16 of the 21 first-class matches spread over four months, and played in all five of the matches against India. He played numerous matches for Commonwealth XI teams in England between 1950 and his last first-class match in 1961, when he was 53.

As an administrator he represented Australia in the UK for both cricket and tennis and was voted President of the International Lawn Tennis Federation in 1964, a position he held for a number of years. He retired in 1974, and returned to Australia. He was appointed a Member of the Order of Australia in 1977 for service to sport.

See also
 List of Victoria first-class cricketers

References

External links
Cricinfo profile
CricketArchive profile

1908 births
1979 deaths
Australian cricketers
Australia Test cricketers
Victoria cricketers
Commonwealth XI cricketers
Buckinghamshire cricketers
Minor Counties cricketers
Marylebone Cricket Club cricketers
Free Foresters cricketers
North v South cricketers
Gentlemen cricketers
Buckinghamshire cricket captains
Cricketers from Melbourne
People educated at Scotch College, Melbourne
Australian Army personnel of World War II
World War II prisoners of war held by Japan
Australian prisoners of war
Members of the Order of Australia
Wicket-keepers
D. G. Bradman's XI cricketers
Presidents of the International Tennis Federation